Kolesnya is a rural locality (a village) in Lavrovskoye Rural Settlement, Sudogodsky District, Vladimir Oblast, Russia. The population was 22 as of 2010.

Geography 
Kolesnya is located 18 km southeast of Sudogda (the district's administrative centre) by road. Peredel is the nearest rural locality.

References 

Rural localities in Sudogodsky District